This is an alphabetical list of cigar brands. Included is information about the company owning the brand name as well as a column allowing easy viewing of the source of that information.

If a brand name begins with the English word "The" or its Spanish equivalents, El, La, Los, and Las, that first word is disregarded. Brands denoted by dual personal names or by personal names preceded by the title, Don, are alphabetized by the first name of the series — thus "Don Pepín Garcia" appears under the letter D, not G. Brand names beginning with De or Del are listed under D.

Feel free to make additions to this list, but please try to keep new listings in alphabetical order. If you are not comfortable making changes to the table, note your additions to be made on the Talk page.

Footnotes

Cigar

IARC Group 1 carcinogens